Edna Chumo Chepngeno (born 15 July 1977) was a former Kenyan volleyball player. She was part of the Kenya women's national volleyball team. She participated in the 1998 FIVB Volleyball Women's World Championship. She also competed with the national team at the 2000 Summer Olympics in Sydney, Australia, finishing 11th.

See also
 Kenya at the 2000 Summer Olympics

References

External links
 
 http://amarillo.com/stories/091900/spo_spikers.shtml#.WJuV_VXyvIU
 http://www.alamy.com/stock-photo-brazilian-volleyball-player-virna-dias-c-spikes-the-ball-against-kenyas-118668058.html
 http://allafrica.com/stories/200107200324.html
http://www.canoe.ca/2000GamesVolleyball/sep18_usa.html

1977 births
Living people
Kenyan women's volleyball players
People from Nairobi
Volleyball players at the 2000 Summer Olympics
Olympic volleyball players of Kenya